Shanghai University is a metro station at Shanghai University in Baoshan District, Shanghai.

This station is part of Line 7 and opened on December 5, 2009. It was the northern terminus of the line until the phase 2 extension to Meilan Lake, which opened on December 28, 2010.

Nearby

Shanghai University, Baoshan Campus

Railway stations in Shanghai
Shanghai Metro stations in Baoshan District
Railway stations in China opened in 2009
Railway stations in China at university and college campuses
Line 7, Shanghai Metro